Edson Gomes (born September 3, 1955), is a Brazilian reggae singer and songwriter. Gomes' musical style is heavily influenced by other Roots reggae artists, such as Bob Marley, Peter Tosh and Alpha Blondy.

Edson Gomes is regarded within Brazil as the biggest Brazilian reggae singer in the country.

English interpretations and translations of his music are available on the Roots Reggae Library.

References 

1955 births
Living people
20th-century Brazilian male singers
20th-century Brazilian singers
Brazilian songwriters
People from Bahia
Roots Reggae Library